Ini Kamoze (born Cecil Campbell; 9 October 1957) is a Jamaican reggae artist who began his career in the early 1980s and rose to prominence in 1994 with the signature song "Here Comes the Hotstepper". The single topped the US Billboard Hot 100 as well as record charts in Denmark and New Zealand, reaching number four on the UK Singles Chart.

Career
He made his first single, "World Affairs", in 1981. Kamoze then released a 12-inch single "Trouble You A Trouble Me"/"General" in 1983.

His self-titled debut album was released in 1984 as a six track mini-LP on Island Records. In the album notes he describes himself as a "pencil thin... disentangled... six-foot vegetarian". The album included the song "World a Music (Out in the Streets They Call It Merther)", which was to be sampled by Damian Marley on his 2005 hit "Welcome to Jamrock". The album was recorded with and produced by Sly and Robbie, with whom he also toured internationally along with Yellowman and Half Pint. By 1988, however, Kamoze had effectively disappeared from the music scene following lukewarm reactions to his intermittent releases.

Kamoze founded his own label, releasing a compilation album Selekta Showcase which featured a popular Kamoze single titled "Stress". Four years later he released his next album, 16 Vibes of Ini Kamoze.

In 1994, Kamoze released the song which would become his signature, "Here Comes the Hotstepper". Adopting another nickname from the song title, Kamoze would become known as the "Hotstepper", from the patois for a man on the run from the law. The song was originally recorded with Philip "Fatis" Burrell and later remixed by Salaam Remi, and initially featured on a reggae music compilation Stir It Up, released on the Epic label. "Here Comes the Hotstepper" was not an entirely new composition, having roots in the song "Land of 1000 Dances", which was a number one R&B hit for Wilson Pickett in 1966 and was first recorded by Chris Kenner in 1962 and reprised in 1963 by Fats Domino. The remixed version of the track also incorporates the bass line from Taana Gardner's 1981 single "Heartbeat". The song appeared on the soundtrack to the fashion-industry satire feature film Prêt-à-Porter.  "Here Comes the Hotstepper" remains Kamoze's only US number one hit (see Hot 100 No. 1 Hits of 1994).

The success of the single sparked an intense bidding war with several major labels hoping to sign him. Kamoze signed a seven-album deal with Elektra Records in November 1994.

Kamoze's career after this high-water mark featured the compilation album Here Comes the Hotstepper which was released in 1995 by Columbia Records (against Kamoze's wishes), around the same time as his first album for Elektra, Lyrical Gangsta.

Both the riddim (known as "World Jam") and the hook of Damian Marley's 2005 hit "Welcome to Jamrock" were sampled from Kamoze's 1984 track "World-A-Music". The opening line – "Out in the streets, they call it merther" – has been sampled in countless drum and bass and dubstep tracks.  His dub version of "Here Comes the Hotstepper", otherwise known as "I'm Steppin' it Hotter This Year", released in 1993, remains a dancehall anthem.

In 2005, Kamoze recorded and released a double album, Debut, on which he re-recorded a number of tracks from earlier in his career. Debut was released on his own 9 Sound Clik label.

In 2009, Kamoze released 51 50 Rule on 9SoundClik. The album includes tracks such as "Rapunzel" (feat. Maya Azucena) and "Hungry Daze".  The album also had some guest features from Sizzla ("R.A.W"), and Busy Signal ("Ta Da Bang").  This was his second album released on the 9 Sound Clik label.

The artist's most recent album release is 2016's Ini Kamoze Meets Xterminator: Tramplin' Down Babylon on his label, 9SoundClik. This is a collection of newly recorded and previously recorded tracks that were originally released as singles on Xterminator Records by producer Phillip "Fattis" Burrell.

Kamoze has also written a book on the history of Port Royal, and a play, Runnings.

His name means "mountain of the true God".

Discography

Albums
Studio albums
Ini Kamoze (1984), Island
Statement (1984), Mango
Pirate (1986), Mango
Shocking Out (1988), RAS
Lyrical Gangsta (1995), East West America/Elektra
Debut (2006), 9SoundClik
51 50 Rule (2009), 9SoundClik
Ini Kamoze meets Xterminator: Tramplin' Down Babylon (2016), 9SoundClik

Compilation albums
16 Vibes of Ini Kamoze (1992), Sonic Sounds
Here Comes the Hotstepper (1995), Columbia/SMDE

Singles

See also
Music of Jamaica
List of Jamaicans
List of reggae musicians
List of roots reggae artists
List of artists who reached number one in the United States
List of 1990s one-hit wonders in the United States

References

External links

1957 births
Living people
People from Saint Mary Parish, Jamaica
Jamaican male singers
Jamaican reggae singers
Reggae fusion artists
Jamaican Rastafarians
Jamaican dancehall musicians
East West Records artists
Island Records artists
Columbia Records artists
Greensleeves Records artists